Glory is an unincorporated community in Lamar County, Texas, in the United States.

History
A post office was established at Glory in 1881, and remained in operation until it was discontinued in 1915. The community was named for the early settlers' optimism.

References

Unincorporated communities in Lamar County, Texas
Unincorporated communities in Texas